Pushkin Leningrad State University (Russian: Ленинградский государственный университет имени А.С. Пушкина) is a university in Russia, located in Pushkin, Saint Petersburg. It was established in 1992 as Leningrad Oblast Pedagogical Institute. It provides training at all levels of post secondary education including bachelor degree, master's degree, PhD courses as well as vocational training and continuing education courses. In 1999 the university was given its current name after the Russian poet Alexander Pushkin.

It comprises the following Faculties:

Faculty of Economics and Investment
Faculty of Psychology
Faculty of Philology
Faculty of Special Education and Social Work
Faculty of History and Social Science
Faculty of Physical Education
Faculty of Philosophy Culture Studies and Arts
Faculty of Mathematics and Computer Studies
Faculty of Law
Faculty of Natural Science Geography and Tourism
Faculty of Foreign Language
as well as 12 branches (institutes) and vocational college

It is currently one of the largest classical universities in Russia

External links
 Official website

Universities in Saint Petersburg